Uelíngarà is a village in the Gabú Region of north-eastern Guinea-Bissau. It lies to the south of Gabú and north of Canjadude.

References

Populated places in Guinea-Bissau
Gabu Region